Slania is the second studio album by Swiss folk metal band Eluveitie. It is the first one to include Anna Murphy as part of the band. It was released on 15 February 2008 through Nuclear Blast.

Reception

Slania has received very positive reviews from both critics and the fanbase.

In a highly positive review, Vera of Lords Of Metal gave the album 94/100 and said that "with "Slania" Eluveitie will promote [themselves] from the second tier to the top of the pagan metal scene!"

Chad Bowar of AllMusic gave the album 4/5 and said "A lot of hooks, plenty of punch, and the unique instruments make Slania an excellent folk metal CD"

Scott Alisogu of Blabbermouth.net gave the album 8/10 and said "As a matter of fact, there is nothing here that warrants any kind of negative criticism"

The album brought Eluveitie in to the mainstream of Folk Metal and they remain to this day as one of the most popular folk metal bands, largely due to the help of the very popular song "Inis Mona" which has over 32 million views on YouTube  (as of July 2022) and is played at all of their concerts. The song uses the musical air of the Breton traditional song Tri Martolod.

Track listing

Credits
 Chrigel Glanzmann - vocals, acoustic guitar, uilleann pipes, mandolin, bodhrán, tin and low whistles
 Anna Murphy – hurdy-gurdy, vocals
 Ivo Henzi – guitar
 Simeon Koch – guitar, vocals
 Meri Tadic – violin, vocals
 Rafi Kirder – bass
 Merlin Sutter – drums
 Sevan Kirder – Irish flute, tin whistles, bagpipes
 Simon Solomon - guitar on track 12

Chart performance

References

2008 albums
Eluveitie albums
Nuclear Blast albums
Albums produced by Jens Bogren